Jet Pilot (March 29, 1944 – March 3, 1967) was an American Thoroughbred racehorse best known for winning the Kentucky Derby in 1947.

Background
Jet Pilot was sired by the 1930 Epsom Derby winner, Blenheim, out of the mare Black Wave, a daughter of the French-bred sire Sir Gallahad III. Blenheim and Sir Gallahad were both brought to stand at stud in the United States by groups of American horsemen, both of which were led by Arthur B. Hancock of Claiborne Farm. Black Wave's dam Black Curl was a half-sister to Myrtlewood, the female-line ancestor of Seattle Slew and Mr Prospector.

Jet Pilot was purchased for US$41,000 at the Keeneland Yearling Sale by Elizabeth Arden and raced under her Maine Chance Farm colors.

Racing career
Racing at age two, Jet Pilot was second in the 1946 Arlington Futurity and third in that year's Futurity Stakes and Champagne Stakes. However, he won the important Tremont Stakes and Pimlico Futurity.

One of the winter-book favorites for the 1947 Kentucky Derby, Jet Pilot broke from post position thirteen and immediately took the lead in the 73rd edition of the Derby and never relinquished it in defeating C. V. Whitney's betting favorite, Phalanx. In the Preakness Stakes, the second leg of the U.S. Triple Crown series, Jet Pilot finished fourth behind Calumet Farm's winner, Faultless. After the Preakness, Jet Pilot contested the Withers Stakes at Belmont Park, where he finished fourth.  He bowed a tendon in that race and was retired to stud for the 1948 season.

Stud record
Jet Pilot sired multiple stakes race winners Jet Action and Myrtles Jet, plus 1951 Champion 2-year-old Filly, Rose Jet. The product of his last mating was born in 1964.

Pedigree

References

 Jet Pilot's offspring at the Triple Crown database by Kathleen Irwin and Joy Reeves

1944 racehorse births
Racehorses bred in Kentucky
Racehorses trained in the United States
Kentucky Derby winners
Thoroughbred family 13-c